Francisca Tala Zacarias (born 20 October 1995) is a Chilean field hockey player.

Tala has represented Chile at both junior and senior levels. She made her junior debut at the 2012 Pan-Am Junior Championship, and her senior debut two years later at a four-nation tournament in Santiago.

Tala has played for Chile at two South American Games, in Santiago 2014 and Cochabamba 2018. The team medalled at both evens, winning silver in 2014 and bronze in 2018.

Tala was a member of the Chilean team at the 2017 Pan American Cup. They won a silver medal after a historic semi-final victory over the United States put the team in the final. The team ultimately lost to Argentina 4–1 in the final.

References

1995 births
Living people
Chilean female field hockey players
South American Games gold medalists for Chile
South American Games silver medalists for Chile
South American Games bronze medalists for Chile
South American Games medalists in field hockey
Competitors at the 2014 South American Games
Competitors at the 2018 South American Games
Competitors at the 2022 South American Games
Female field hockey midfielders
20th-century Chilean women
21st-century Chilean women